Mashkovtsev may refer to:
 Vladilen Mashkovtsev (1929—1997) — Russian writer
 Mashkovtsev (volcano) — volcano in Kamchatka (Russia)